Figueroa is a Spanish surname of Galician origin. Notable people with the surname include:

Álvaro de Figueroa, 1st Count of Romanones (1863–1950), Spanish politician, Prime Minister (1912-1918)
Amon Tobin (1972–), Brazilian musician, has released music as Figueroa
Ángel Figueroa (1981–), Puerto Rican basketball player
Ángel Figueroa (boxer) (1929–1953), Puerto Rican professional boxer and Korean War casualty
Barbara Figueroa, American chef
Bien Figueroa (1964–), Dominican baseball player
Brandon Figueroa (1996–), US professional boxer
Brian Figueroa (1999–), Mexican football player
Bryan Figueroa (1999–), Chilean football player
Carlos Figueroa, several people
Daniel Figueroa (1983–), American baseball outfielder
Danny Figueroa (1959–1998), American serial killer
Don Figueroa (contemporary), US comic book artist
Ed Figueroa (1948–), Puerto Rican baseball player
Edwin Figueroa (1984–), US mixed martial artist
Elder Figueroa (1980–), Colombian-born, naturalized Salvadoran football player
Elías Figueroa (1946–), Chilean football player
Elmer Figueroa, better known as Chayanne (1968–), Puerto Rican Latin pop singer and actor
Emiliano Figueroa (1866–1931), President of Chile 1925–1927
Enrique “Quique” Figueroa (1964–), Puerto Rican regatta sailor
Erik Figueroa (1991–), Chilean-Swedish footballer 
Federico Brito Figueroa (1921–2000), Venezuelan historian and anthropologist
Fernanda Figueroa (1997–), Costa Rican football player
Fernando Figueroa (1849–1919), President of El Salvador 1907–1911
Fernando Figueroa (footballer) (1925–2011), Mexican football player
Francisco de Figueroa, several people
Francisco Acuña de Figueroa (1790–1862), Uruguayan poet
Francisco García de la Rosa Figueroa (18th century), Mexican monk
Francisco Ramón Herboso y Figueroa (1720–1782), Peruvian archbishop
Frank Figueroa (contemporary), agent of the US Department of Homeland Security, pleaded guilty to exposing himself
Gabriel Figueroa (1907–1997), Mexican cinematographer
Germán Figueroa (1975–), Puerto Rican professional wrestler
Héctor Figueroa (1988–), Spanish football player
Héctor Figueroa (activist) (1962–2019), Puerto Rican labor activist
Hernán Figueroa (1927–), Chilean decathlete
Jasmin Figueroa (1985–), Filipina Olympic archer
Javier Ángel Figueroa (1862–1945), Chilean lawyer and politician, brother of President Emiliano Figueroa
Jerónimo Figueroa Cabrera (a.k.a. “Momo”) (1982–), Spanish professional football player
Joaquín Figueroa (1863–1929), Chilean politician, brother of President Emiliano Figueroa
John Figueroa (1920–1999), Jamaican poet and educator
Jonathan Figueroa (a.k.a. “Amazing Red”), (born 1982), US professional wrestler
José Figueroa (1792-1835) General and the Mexican territorial Governor of Alta California
José Figueroa Alcorta (1860–1931), President of Argentina 1906–1910
José Manuel Figueroa (1975–), US singer, songwriter, and actor
José Manuel Figueroa (weightlifter) (1939–), Puerto Rican Olympic weightlifter
Juan Figueroa, president of Universal Health Care Foundation of Connecticut
L. J. Figueroa (1998–), Dominican-American basketball player
LaToyia Figueroa (1981–2005), US woman who disappeared and was found murdered in 2005
Liz Figueroa (contemporary), US politician, California state senator
Luciano Gabriel “Lucho” Figueroa (1981–), Argentine football player
Luis Figueroa (baseball) (1974–), Puerto Rican baseball player
Luis Figueroa (singer) (1989–), US Latin pop singer-songwriter
Luis de Guzmán y Figueroa, Spanish soldier and colonial governor of New Mexico from 1647 to 1649
Maynor Figueroa (1983–), Honduran footballer
Miguel Figueroa (1953–), head of the Communist Party of Canada
Miguel Figueroa (swimmer) (1965–), Puerto Rican deportist
Narciso Figueroa (1906–2004), Puerto Rican danza musician and composer
Nelson Figueroa (1974–), US baseball player 
Omar Figueroa Jr. (1989–), US professional boxer
Orlando Figueroa (a.k.a. NASA Mars Czar) (1955–), Puerto Rican engineer who became head of NASA Mars Exploration
Óscar Figueroa (film editor) (1958–), Mexican film editor
Óscar Figueroa (weightlifter) (1983–), Colombian weightlifter and silver medalist
Paco Figueroa (1983–), American baseball second baseman
Pedro de Castro y Figueroa (1685–1741), Spanish viceroy of New Spain 1740–1741
Ramón Báez Figueroa (1956–), Dominican banker, accused of bank fraud in 2003
Richard Figueroa (1996–), Venezuelan football player
Rodner Figueroa (1972–), Venezuelan television show host
Rodney Figueroa (1966–), Puerto Rican wrestler
Rogelio Figueroa (1963–), Puerto Rican engineer and politician
Sammy Figueroa, US percussionist
Sotero Figueroa (1851-1923), journalist, dramatist, speaker and author
Talyn Rahman-Figueroa (1985-), Diplomatic Director and novelist
Tite Figueroa (1926–1986), Puerto Rican baseball player
Tito Figueroa (1914–), Puerto Rican baseball player
Tobías Figueroa (1992–). Argentine football player
Tony Figueroa (1999–), Mexican football player
Víctor Figueroa (1983–), Argentine football player
Víctor Figueroa (biathlete) (1956–), Argentine Olympic biathlete

See also 
Juan Carlos Higuero, Spanish runner

References

Galician-language surnames